Aage Kadam (English translation - Forward March) is 1943 Hindi-language black-and-white film directed by N. R. Acharya and starring Motilal, Anjali Devi, Mubarak, Padma, Rajkumari Shukai and Amritlal.

References

External links 
 

1943 films
1940s Hindi-language films
Indian black-and-white films